Sedalia is a hamlet in southern Alberta, Canada within Special Area No. 3. The area was developed when the railroad came through in 1925.

See also 
List of communities in Alberta
List of hamlets in Alberta

References 

Hamlets in Alberta
Special Area No. 3